The 1972 Tirreno–Adriatico was the seventh edition of the Tirreno–Adriatico cycle race and was held from 11 March to 15 March 1972. The race started in Ladispoli and finished in San Benedetto del Tronto. The race was won by Roger De Vlaeminck.

General classification

References

1972
1972 in Italian sport
March 1972 sports events in Europe